Anna and the Apocalypse is a 2017 British Christmas zombie musical film directed by John McPhail from a screenplay by Alan McDonald and Ryan McHenry based on McHenry's 2010 BAFTA nominated short Zombie Musical. It stars an ensemble cast of largely unknown young talent, including Ella Hunt, Malcolm Cumming, Sarah Swire, Christopher Leveaux, Marli Siu, Ben Wiggins, Mark Benton and Paul Kaye.

The film premiered at Fantastic Fest on 22 September 2017. It was released in the United Kingdom by Vertigo Releasing and United States by Orion Pictures on 30 November 2018 to generally positive reviews from critics, commending the performances, musical numbers and characterisation.

Plot
In Little Haven, Scotland, Anna Shepherd is about to finish school and plans to travel for a year before attending university, much to the displeasure of her widower father Tony. Her friends are dealing with their own issues: her best friend John, an artist, is secretly in love with her, budding filmmaker Chris is struggling with a class assignment and transfer student Steph is trying to get her social justice reporting past the tyrannical vice principal Mr. Savage. Nick, Anna's one night stand, is also making her life difficult. On the night of the school Christmas show, in which Chris's girlfriend Lisa is performing, Anna and John are working in the local bowling alley and Chris and Steph have gone to the homeless shelter to film for Steph's story. During this time, a zombie infection starts spreading. Anna and John bond over her post graduation plans after work.

The next morning, Anna and John leave for the school, completely oblivious to the zombie chaos around them. When they encounter a zombie dressed as a snowman, Anna decapitates him with a seesaw. The story then cuts to the school, where a bunch of adults, Chris's grandmother, Mr. Savage, Tony and Lisa are taking refuge. Tony and Mr. Savage argue about whether to save the other survivors outside or lock the doors and stay inside the school, with Mr. Savage winning the argument with a sudden military broadcast. Anna and John, figuring it will be too dangerous to go home or to the school, go to the bowling alley where they meet Steph and Chris, who have taken shelter there. Steph finds out that an army evacuation is coming to the school, so the group plans to go there once it is safe. Anna and Steph find the zombified cleaner and Steph kills her, alerting a group of zombified bowlers to break in. The group kills them all after a bloody fight and realize that getting to their loved ones will be difficult.

The next morning Anna, Steph, John and Chris wake up to find that the army has been zombified and no evacuation is coming. Regardless, they set off to the school to see if their loved ones are still alive. Nick - who is greatly enjoying the carnage - and his friends rescue the group from a horde of zombies and join them on their way to the school. Anna tells John that she still plans to go traveling despite everything that has happened. She also notes to him that he is her "best friend" implying she knows about his feelings but does not reciprocate. At the school, Savage fights to maintain authority as the others plan their own evacuation.

The students cut through a Christmas tree emporium in an attempt to save time but are ambushed by zombies, which kill Nick's friends. Once they escape, John is bitten; he gets Anna to safety but sacrifices himself to distract the zombies. The survivors reach the school, where Savage has let the zombies in as a last ditch measure of control. Anna and Nick split off to search for Tony while Steph and Chris look for his family and Steph's car keys. Nick reveals that his father asked Nick to kill him after he was bitten, before distracting a group of zombies so that Anna can find her father. Chris finds Lisa but his grandmother had already died of a heart attack. Steph, Chris and Lisa find the car keys in Savage's office but Chris and Lisa are bitten while trying to escape, having used Chris's video footage as a distraction.

Anna finds Savage in the auditorium, where he is using Tony as bait for the zombies. Anna gets to the stage and saves Tony, but he lashes out at Savage and they fight. Savage falls to the zombies but Tony is bitten in the scuffle. Anna says goodbye to her dad as Nick arrives and the two of them leave the school. They prepare for one last stand before Steph rescues them in her car and Anna finally leaves Little Haven to look for a safe place.

Cast

Production

Development

In 2009, whilst attending Edinburgh College of Art, Ryan McHenry came up with the idea for a 'zombie musical' short film, taking inspiration from High School Musical. In 2010, McHenry wrote and directed the short film in Dumfries High School, with his friends Naysun Alae-Carew as producer and Ryan Clachrie as production designer. In 2011, the short film titled Zombie Musical won Best Producer (Short Form) for Alaw-Carew at the British Academy Scotland New Talent Awards and received two additional nominations, including Best Director (McHenry) and Best Original Music (Toby Mottershead). Black Camel, a Glasgow-based production company, expressed interest in developing a feature-length film based on the short, with McHenry directing and Alae-Carew producing. McHenry was also hired to co-write the screenplay with Alan McDonald.

In 2013, development was halted when McHenry was diagnosed with osteosarcoma. After entering remission, he returned to work on the project with McDonald, now titled Anna and the Apocalypse. In May 2015, McHenry passed away from cancer, though Alae-Carew and McDonald continued to develop the project. The film was dedicated to McHenry, who died two years before the film's release.

Writing
By 2016, John McPhail had taken over as director with McDonald as sole screenwriter, though McHenry received credit as co-writer. McPhail was at first over joining as director before production. "They’d all been doing this together and all of a sudden here I come in. I was nervous about it, but they welcomed me with open arms, they really, really did and that made everything nice and easy". Following McHenry's death, the initial draft of the film's script had a darker, cynical tone, which McDonald believed was due to McHenry's passing. "The reason that draft was so dark was because I missed my friend... I guess, in the story that we were always telling and what ultimately became Ryan’s story. Finding a way for us all to rediscover the joy of it was what I think kept us on target and ultimately created the movie that we’ve made now."

Music
In 2014, Roddy Hart was hired to write the film's songs, in collaboration with Tommy Reilly.

Filming
Principal photography took place over five weeks between 16 January and 22 February 2017 in and around the Inverclyde area near Glasgow. Production was primarily based at the former building of St. Stephen's High School at Southfield Avenue, Port Glasgow. The film was produced by Blazing Griffin Pictures, Black Camel Pictures, Parkhouse Pictures and Creative Scotland.

Inspirations
Director John McPhail said that Anna and the Apocalypse was influenced by the films West Side Story (1961), The Rocky Horror Picture Show (1975) and The Breakfast Club (1985), as well as the Buffy the Vampire Slayer musical episode "Once More, with Feeling". McPhail also said that the film includes "nods" to the zombie films Night of the Living Dead (1968), Dawn of the Dead (1978), The Evil Dead (1981), The Happiness of the Katakuris (2001) and Shaun of the Dead (2004). The crop tops and short shorts seen in the film were inspired by the costume design in the slasher film Sleepaway Camp (1983).

Soundtrack
A soundtrack consisting of 13 songs from the film was released on 23 November 2018.

The deleted song, "Which Side Are You On?", is featured only on the vinyl release and director's cut. Another deleted song, "Some Things Will Never Change", is present in the bonus features of the Blu-ray release.

Release
Anna and the Apocalypse had its world premiere in the Fantastic Fest on 22 September 2017. On 5 October 2017, the film held its European premiere at Sitges Film Festival in Catalonia, Spain.

On 10 January 2018, it was picked up for North and Latin American theatrical distribution by Orion Pictures. In the United States, the film received a limited theatrical release on 30 November 2018, with a nationwide expansion on 7 December.

Home media
The US theatrical release (93 minutes) was only given a digital release on 12 February 2019. It was made available on Hulu on 13 November 2019.

The film was released on region 2 DVD on 8 April 2019, by Vertigo Releasing through Kaleidoscope Home Entertainment. It was released in a region-free two-disc Blu-ray on 2 December 2019, by Second Sight Films. Both the UK theatrical release (97 minutes) and the director's cut (108 minutes) are included in the set, the latter containing roughly ten minutes of footage absent from the theatrical version.

Reception

Box office
In the United States and Canada the film debuted to $52,588 from five cinemas, an average of $10,518.

Critical response
On review aggregator Rotten Tomatoes, the film holds an approval rating of 77% based on 122 reviews, with an average rating of 6.7/10. The website's critical consensus reads, "Anna and the Apocalypse finds fresh brains and a lot of heart in the crowded zombie genre—not to mention a fun genre mashup populated by rootable characters." On Metacritic, the film has a weighted average score of 63 out of 100, based on 26 critics, indicating "generally favourable reviews".

Dread Central gave it 5 out of 5 stars, saying that it's "not just a great movie but a great musical as well."

Accolades

See also
 List of Christmas films

References

External links
 
 
 
 

2017 films
2017 comedy horror films
2010s British films
2010s Christmas comedy films
2010s Christmas horror films
2010s English-language films
2010s musical comedy films
British Christmas comedy films
British Christmas horror films
British musical comedy films
British zombie comedy films
Christmas musicals
Features based on short films
Films about viral outbreaks
Films directed by John McPhail
Films shot in Scotland
Vertigo Films films